Donal O'Brien may refer to:
Domnall Mór Ua Briain (died 1194), king of Munster
Donal O'Brien (hurler) (1940–2012), Irish hurler
Donald O'Brien (actor) (1933), French-born Irish film and television actor

See also
Domnall Ua Briain (disambiguation)